Natalie Jenette Lander (born March 28, 1983) is an American actress. She is the daughter of actors David Lander and Kathy Fields. She is known for her work on ABC's The Middle, where she plays Debbie. Other TV credits include Castle, Touch, and Hannah Montana. Lander is also known for her work in video games, such as the voice of Kinzie Kensington in the Saints Row series. She placed fifth in the reality competition Legally Blonde: The Musical – The Search for Elle Woods, which aired on MTV.

Filmography

Television roles
 Aim High – Marcy
 Castle – Marie
 Hannah Montana – Annie (Ep. "Wherever I Go")
 Legally Blonde: The Musical – The Search for Elle Woods – Natalie
 Oishi High School Battle – Stacy
 She Spies – Beach Girl
 The Middle – Debbie
 The Weekly Sketch – Sara
 Touch – College Girl
 Trainers – Paige
 Winx Club – Mirta, Lithia
 Goldie & Bear – Goldie Locks
 K.C. Undercover – Darci (Ep. "Virtual Insanity")
 Justice League Action – Stargirl
 Lopez – Rachel Naismith
 Spider-Man – Liz Allan, Screwball
 Major Crimes – Hollywood Dallas
 Craig of the Creek – Brigid/additional voices
 Bizaardvark – Whitney (Ep. "The Stand-Up Standoff")
 13 Reasons Why – Amanda
 That Girl Lay Lay – Maggie the Clown (Ep. "Mozzarella Heads")
 9-1-1: Lone Star – Tiffany
 Animaniacs – Gigi Soda (Ep. "Soda-pressed")

Film roles
 Superpowerless – Danniell
 Daylight Savings – Sarah
 L.A. D.J. – Michelle
 Material Girls – Actress/Model
 Surrogate Valentine – Sarah

Video game roles
 Blur – Shannon
 Chocobo GP – Terra Branford
 Dissidia Final Fantasy – Terra Branford
 Dissidia 012 Final Fantasy – Terra Branford
 Dissidia Final Fantasy NT – Terra Branford
 Fire Emblem Fates – Elise, Nina
 Fire Emblem Heroes – Fir, Amelia, Elise, Nina
 God of War III – Pandora
 Infamous Second Son – Additional Voices
 Infinite Crisis – Stargirl
 Rogue Galaxy – Kisala
 Saints Row: The Third – Kinzie Kensington
 Saints Row IV – Kinzie Kensington
 Saints Row: Gat Out of Hell – Kinzie Kensington
 Shrek the Third – Lady of the Lake, Witch 2, Ogre Baby
 The 3rd Birthday – Emily Jefferson
 Thrillville – Teen Female 3
 White Knight Chronicles II – Miu
 World of Final Fantasy – Terra Branford
 Agents of Mayhem – Kinzie Kensington / "Safeword"
 Over the Hedge – Heather

Other
 Buffy motion comics – Willow Rosenberg
 Chico's Angels – Various roles

References

External links
 

Living people
American film actresses
American television actresses
American video game actresses
American voice actresses
Jewish American actresses
Participants in American reality television series
21st-century American actresses
1983 births
21st-century American Jews